Vazhivilakku is a 1976 Indian Malayalam-language film, directed by Vijay. The film stars Prem Nazir, Sukumari, Jayabharathi and M. G. Soman. The film has musical score by V. Dakshinamoorthy.

Cast
 
Prem Nazir 
Sukumari 
Jayabharathi 
M. G. Soman 
Mallika Sukumaran 
Nanditha Bose 
Sumithra 
Thikkurissy Sukumaran Nair

Soundtrack
The music was composed by V. Dakshinamoorthy and the lyrics were written by P. Bhaskaran.

References

External links
 

1976 films
1970s Malayalam-language films